The May 2016 Dürümlü bombing (also known as Dürümlü massacre in Turkey) was a truck bombing that took place in Dürümlü hamlet in Diyarbakir's Sur district, Turkey on 12 May 2016 at approximately 22:30 local time. As a result of the attack 16 villagers were killed and 23 villagers were wounded. The People's Defence Forces (HPG), the military wing of the Kurdistan Workers' Party (PKK), accepted that the truck was driven by members of the HPG, but the HPG also claimed that the explosives should have detonated elsewhere and that the truck only detonated as villagers opened fire on the truck.

See also
 February 2016 Diyarbakır bombing
 March 2016 Diyarbakır bombing
 May 2016 Diyarbakır bombing
 November 2016 Diyarbakır bombing

References

2016 murders in Turkey
2010s in Diyarbakır
21st-century mass murder in Turkey
Car and truck bombings in Turkey
Improvised explosive device bombings in 2016
Kurdish–Turkish conflict (2015–present) 
Kurdistan Workers' Party attacks
Mass murder in 2016
Mass murder in Diyarbakır
May 2016 crimes in Asia 
Terrorist incidents in Diyarbakır
Terrorist incidents in Turkey in 2016